Leon Douglas, better known under the name Floyd The Locsmif, is a music producer living in Atlanta.
He was born and raised in  Fitzgerald, GA. Starting with pause mix experiment tapes in the late 1980s Floyd The Locsmif has since produced music for some of the most respected emcees in underground & independent hip-hop.

Music

Alongside DJ Jamad (Afromentals/The Aphilliates), Locsmif entered the mixtape scene in 2004 with the highly acclaimed  Outskirts: The Unofficial Lost OutKast Remixes, an OutKast remix CD, consequently expanding Locsmif's fan base and laying the foundation for his widely received Divine Dezignz series.
In early 2005, Locsmif's Divine Dezignz 1: Discovery, a collection of his original soul and hip-hop instrumentals, made its debut at iTunes and was featured on three consecutive iTunes Street Official Mixtapes. 
Adding upon the success of Discovery, Locsmif secured a national distribution deal with Fontana through High Wire Music to release Divine Dezignz 1.2: Re-Discovered.
Guests on the record include Lil Sci (from Scienz Of Life and Sol Uprising), Stahhr (from MF Doom / King Geedorah’s “Take Me To Your Leader” LP), and others.

Whether it's jazzy soul or overground ruggedness, Locsmif's clientele includes Atlanta's own Cee Lo Green,  50 Cent for which the Locsmif produced Maybe We Crazy from 50's video game Bulletproof soundtrack that snagged Best Original Song in a Video Game at Spike TVs 2006 Video Game Awards. 
His work on O.C.’s Starchild album earned critical acclaim.

Locsmif's versatility in the music marketplace has landed him spots on various mixtapes and compilations such as Shaman Work Recordings' 2005 Beatology Vol. 2, 
a commission to produce the soundtrack to Coca-Cola/Nestea's national Ice campaign, which promoted the launch of NesteaIce.com in May 2005.

Additionally, Locsmif hosted a weekly Hip-Hop mix show segment called INTHELOOP on  Sirius Satellite Radio and has been a featured guest DJ on Shade45's Rep Your Set show.

Floyd The Locsmif has also set up his own entertainment company called "In The Loop Entertainment".
He is now being represented by the independent record label Tasteful Licks.

Discography

Releases

2011: Divine Dezignz #3: Dirty Canvas, In The Loop Recordings
2009: Divine Dezignz #2: Soul, Etc., In The Loop Recordings/Tasteful Licks Records
2007: Interludez and Essentialz,  In The Loop Recordings/Tasteful Licks Records
2005: Divine Dezignz #1.3: Deluxe Discovery,  In The Loop Recordings/High Wire Music
2005: Divine Dezignz #1.2: Re-Discovered,  In The Loop Recordings/High Wire Music
2005: Divine Dezignz #1: Discovery, In The Loop Recordings/High Wire Music
2004: Outskirts: The Unofficial Lost OutKast Remixes (with DJ Jamad), In The Loop Recordings

Production

1998: Southbound Strategies / Swamp Fields / Moment Of Silence, Wrong Crowd Records
2002: Rhyme Fluid, Sub Verse Music
2003: Sol Power, (Sol Power), Shaman Work
2004: Cee-Lo Green... Is The Soul Machine, (Sometimes), Arista
2004: Outskirts: The Unofficial Lost OutKast Remixes, In The Loop Recordings/Tasteful Licks Records
2005: Divine Dezigns #1.2 Re-Discovered, In The Loop Recordings/Tasteful Licks Records
2005: Divine Dezignz #1: Discovery, In The Loop Recordings/Tasteful Licks Records
2005: Getaway/Evaridae, Word Of Mouth
2005: Shaman Work Presents: The Family Files Vol.2, Watching U, Fluid), Shaman Work
2005: Starchild, Grit Records
2005: The Hear After, (Audio Visual), Penalty Recordings
2005: The Leak Edition Volume 1, (Always Bless), Shaman Work
2005:  Undercover Cuts 27, (Audio Visual), Undercover Mag
2006: Will Rap For Food, (Locsmif, Freestyle), Major League Entertainment
2007: The Leak Edition Vol.2, (Always Bless, Bonus), Shaman Work
2008: Then What Happened?, (What You Holdin'?), BBE

References

External links
 Official Website
 Locsmif on Myspace.com
 Locsmif on Facebook
 Locsmif on Last.fm
 Locsmif on Twitter

Living people
Year of birth missing (living people)